is a Japanese football player.

Playing career
Tomita was born in Saitama Prefecture on June 9, 1996. He joined J2 League club Kyoto Sanga FC in 2018.

Career statistics

Last update: end of 2018 season

References

External links

1996 births
Living people
Waseda University alumni
Association football people from Saitama Prefecture
Japanese footballers
J2 League players
Kyoto Sanga FC players
Association football defenders